Last Guardian of Everness is a fantasy novel by John C. Wright (the author's first such novel, having been written before The Golden Age). It has a sequel, Mists of Everness.

Overview 

The novel tells the tale of Raven, son of Raven, who bargains with a necromancer, Koschei the Deathless, to save the life of his pretty young wife Wendy, who is in the terminal ward of the hospital. The price is that Raven must kill an innocent stranger. The stranger selected is Galen Waylock, the youngest and last watchman of an order of guardians protecting mankind from a supernatural invasion through the Gates of Greater Slumber. The conceit is that man has been separated from the world of dreams in order to preserve him: the fairies and gods remembered in myth yearn to re-establish their old rule.

The story draws on varied mythological sources.  Koschei (or Koschey) the Deathless is from Russian folk tales; the Selkie are from Irish lore, the Kelpie, Scottish; Oberon, Titania, and Merlin the Magician, English. The giants Surtvitnir and Bergelmir are Norse.  The angels and fallen angels in the story answer either to their Christian or pagan names: The Archangel Uriel, for example, is also called Hyperion, and Apollo the Destroyer.

American fantasy novels
2004 American novels
Tor Books books